Acanthoproctus diadematus (Namibia katydid or Nara cricket) is an armoured katydid, bush-cricket, or ground cricket endemic to the Namib Desert of southern Africa, where it lives in the tall sand dunes along the Kuiseb River in Namib-Naukluft National Park. The katydid feeds on the !nara melon endemic to the area.

References

Endemic fauna of Namibia
Tettigoniidae
Insects described in 1858
Orthoptera of Africa